The following is a list of county-maintained roads in Cass County, North Dakota, United States.


Route list

See also

References

 
 

Transportation in Cass County, North Dakota
Roads in North Dakota